The 2012 Pure Michigan 400 was a NASCAR Sprint Cup Series stock car race held on August 19, 2012 at Michigan International Speedway in Brooklyn, Michigan. Contested over 201 laps, it was the twenty-third race of the 2012 NASCAR Sprint Cup Series season. Greg Biffle of Roush Fenway Racing won the race, Brad Keselowski was second and Kasey Kahne finished third.

Report

Background

Michigan International Speedway is one of six superspeedways to hold NASCAR races; the others are Daytona International Speedway, Auto Club Speedway, Indianapolis Motor Speedway, Pocono Raceway and Talladega Superspeedway. The track's turns are banked at eighteen degrees, while the front stretch, the location of the finish line, is banked at twelve degrees. The back stretch, has a five degree banking. Michigan International Speedway has a seating capacity of 137,243 people.

Before the race, Jimmie Johnson led the Drivers' Championship with 777 points, and Greg Biffle stood in second with 776. Matt Kenseth was third in the Drivers' Championship with 775 points, 15 ahead of Dale Earnhardt Jr. and 42 ahead of Brad Keselowski in fourth and fifth. Martin Truex Jr. with 728 was eleven points ahead of Clint Bowyer, as Tony Stewart with 716 points, was six ahead of Kevin Harvick, and 23 in front of Denny Hamlin. In the Manufacturers' Championship, Chevrolet was leading with 157 points, 32 ahead of Toyota. Ford, with 109 points, was 16 points ahead of Dodge in the battle for third.

Practice and qualifying

Three practice sessions will be held before the Sunday race—one on Friday, August 17, and two on Saturday, August 18. The first session lasted 90 minutes, while the second and third are scheduled for 55 minutes.  Johnson was quickest with a time of 36.465 seconds in the first session, less than two-tenths of a second faster than Kasey Kahne. Mark Martin was just off Kahne's pace, followed by Harvick, Truex Jr., and Carl Edwards. Ryan Newman (who was battling the flu and wasn't sure he would be able to race; Stewart-Haas had David Reutimann on standby) was seventh, still within four-tenths of a second of Johnson's time.

Forty-five cars were entered for qualifying, but only forty-three could qualify for the race because of NASCAR's qualifying procedure. Martin clinched the 55th pole position of his career, with a time of 36.053 seconds. He was joined on the front row of the grid by Edwards. Johnson qualified third, Kenseth took fourth, and Kahne started fifth. Trevor Bayne, Truex Jr., Marcos Ambrose, Landon Cassill and Paul Menard rounded out the top ten. The two drivers that failed to qualify for the race were Stephen Leicht and J. J. Yeley. Once the qualifying session concluded, Martin said, "I've had a few years of practice. I don't need a whole bunch of practice. I need fast race cars. That's what Rodney Childers is giving me. All it is driving the car. I've been doing that since I was 15."

Race
After the drop of the green flag, Martin would jump out to an early lead. However, an early spin from David Gilliland through the grass on Lap 6 would bunch the field back up again. After restarting on Lap 10, Martin would once again easily retain the lead and build another substantial gap to the second place car. The first round of green flag pit stops would begin on Lap 35. Mixed strategies would see some teams taking two tires and others four. A number of drivers, notably Keselowski and Johnson, would stay out for a few laps longer than the rest of the field while stretching fuel mileage before the lead would cycle back to Martin on Lap 46.

Following a long green-flag run, Martin would continue to lead while having to deal with an ever-increasing amount of lapped traffic. On Lap 64, however, disaster would strike for Martin while coming up on the lapped cars of Bobby Labonte and Juan Pablo Montoya. Montoya would make contact with Labonte, turning him coming out of Turn 4. Martin, reacting to this, would spin out while attempting to avoid the two and begin to careen down pit road. After glancing off the inner pit wall, Martin's car would slam side-first into an exposed retaining wall at the garage opening midway down pit road. The exposed wall segment would penetrate deep into the car's side, puncturing the fuel tank, and causing fuel to spill around the car. The force of the impact would also cause several tires and other debris stationed on the wall to go flying back into the garage area. Luckily, track and safety officials were quick on the scene to extinguish any flames and no one, including Martin, suffered any injuries.

The race would restart on Lap 74 with Clint Bowyer taking a short-lived lead before another caution would fly after a crash from Regan Smith due to contact from Marcos Ambrose. Varying pit strategies and the timing of cautions would continue to mix the field up from its starting order. A fourth caution would come out after Joey Logano hit the wall after a tire failure from contact with Montoya. On the restart, Biffle would find himself near the front before soon fighting for the lead. He would take his first lead of the day on Lap 101 after passing Truex Jr. Biffle would hold the lead for 10 laps before pitting. Attrition and the long runs would also begin to take their toll as both Tony Stewart and Jeff Gordon would exit the race with engine failures. These engine failures, both being from in-house Hendrick Motorsports-built engines, would cause other teams running them to begin to worry about their own cars including Johnson.

The final fifty laps would be run mostly under green and would see a flurry of ten lead changes with only one driver, Johnson, leading more than ten consecutive laps during the final quarter of the race distance. Lap 182 would see the #21 car of Trevor Bayne sustain a tire failure and hit the wall in Turn 1, bringing out another caution and setting up a just over ten-lap sprint to the finish. The race would restart on lap 187 with Keselowski leading. He would hold the lead until being passed by Johnson with just under ten laps to go. Biffle would also get around Keselowski to move up into second.

Johnson, cruising to a seemingly assured win, would then suffer an engine failure (much like those of Stewart and Gordon) with only five laps to go. Oil spilling from Johnson's car would bring out the final caution and set-up a green-white-checkered finish. The final restart would lead to a final shootout between Biffle and Keselowski with Biffle edging out Keselowski to earn his third win at Michigan and his second of the season.

Results

Qualifying

Jimmie Johnson will start from the rear of the field for changing an engine.
Ryan Newman will start from the rear of the field for having a back-up driver.
Sam Hornish Jr. will start from the rear of the field for having a back-up driver qualify the car.
Dale Earnhardt Jr. will start from the rear of the field for switching to a back-up car.

Race results

Standings after the race

Drivers' Championship standings

Manufacturers' Championship standings

Note: Only the top five positions are included for the driver standings.

References

NASCAR races at Michigan International Speedway
Pure Michigan 400
Pure Michigan 400
Pure Michigan 400